Renan da Silva Costa or simply Renan (born September 4, 1987 in Campina Grande), is a Brazilian defensive midfielder. He currently plays for Sport on loan from Treze.

Contract
Sport (Loan) 14 March 2007 to 14 March 2008
Treze 5 December 2005 to 5 December 2008

External links
CBF

1987 births
Living people
Brazilian footballers
Treze Futebol Clube players
Sport Club do Recife players
People from Campina Grande
Association football midfielders
Sportspeople from Paraíba